Sudworth is a surname. Notable people with the surname include:

Anne Sudworth, English artist
George Bishop Sudworth (1864–1927), American botanist
John Sudworth, a British journalist